Barabatum (also, Barabat’um, Barbatum, Brrat’umb, Parravat’ap’, and Prravt’umb) is a town in the Syunik Province of Armenia.

References 

Populated places in Syunik Province